Igor Aleksandrovich Smolnikov (born 8 August 1988) is a Russian football player who plays as a right-back for Lokomotiv Moscow.

Club career
On 29 July 2020, he returned to Krasnodar, signing a 2-year contract with a 1-year extension option. On 8 June 2021, his contract with Krasnodar was terminated by mutual consent.

On 23 July 2021, he joined Arsenal Tula.

On 8 February 2023, Smolnikov returned to Lokomotiv Moscow on a contract until the end of the 2022–23 season.

International career
Smolnikov was called up by Fabio Capello to the Russia squad for the first time on 4 October 2013 for the 2014 FIFA World Cup qualification matches against Luxembourg and Azerbaijan. He made his debut for the national team on 19 November 2013 in a friendly against South Korea.

On 11 May 2018, he was included in Russia's extended 2018 FIFA World Cup squad. On 3 June 2018, he was included in the finalized World Cup squad. He played his first and last World Cup game in the last group stage game against Uruguay on 25 June 2018 when he started the game, but was sent-off for two yellow cards in the 36th minute.

On 11 May 2021, he was named as a back-up player for Russia's UEFA Euro 2020 squad.

Career statistics

Club

International
Statistics accurate as of match played 14 October 2020.

Honours
Zenit Saint Petersburg
Russian Premier League: 2014–15, 2018–19, 2019–20
Russian Cup: 2015–16, 2019–20
Russian Super Cup: 2015, 2016

References

1988 births
People from Kamensk-Uralsky
Sportspeople from Sverdlovsk Oblast
Living people
Russian footballers
Association football midfielders
Russia youth international footballers
Russia under-21 international footballers
Russia national football B team footballers
Russia international footballers
FC Torpedo Moscow players
FC Lokomotiv Moscow players
FC Ural Yekaterinburg players
FC Chita players
FC Zhemchuzhina Sochi players
FC Rostov players
FC Krasnodar players
FC Zenit Saint Petersburg players
FC Arsenal Tula players
Russian Premier League players
Russian First League players
UEFA Euro 2016 players
2017 FIFA Confederations Cup players
2018 FIFA World Cup players